Savigny's fringe-fingered lizard (Acanthodactylus savignyi) is a species of lizard in the family Lacertidae. The species is  endemic to western North Africa.

Etymology
Both the specific name, savignyi, and the common name, Savignyi's fringe-fingered lizard, are in honor of French zoologist Marie Jules César Savigny.

Geographic range
A. savignyi is found in Algeria and possibly Morocco.

Habitat
The natural habitats of Savignyi's fringe-fingered lizard are temperate shrubland, Mediterranean-type shrubby vegetation, and sandy shores.

Reproduction
A. savignyi is oviparous.

Conservation status
A. savignyi is threatened by habitat loss.

References

Further reading
Audouin JV (1809)."Explication sommaire des planches de reptiles (supplément) publiées par Jules-César Savigny ". In: Geoffroy Saint-Hilaire É (1809). Description de l'Égypte ou recueil des observations et des recherches qui ont été faites en Égypte, pendant l'expédition de l'armée française, publiée par les ordres de Sa Majesté l'Empereur Napoléon le Grand. Histoire naturelle, Tome premier. Paris. (Lacerta savignyi, new species, p. 172 + Plate I, figure 8). (in French).
Boulenger GA (1887). Catalogue of the Lizards in the British Museum (Natural History). Second Edition. Volume III. Lacertidæ ... London: Trustees of the British Museum (Natural History). (Taylor and Francis, printers). xii + 575 pp. + Plates I-XL. (Acanthodactylus savignyi, pp. 63–64).
Salvador, Alfredo (1982). "A revision of the lizards of the genus Acanthodactylus (Sauria: Lacertidae)". Bonner Zoologische Monographien (16): 1–167. (Acanthodactylus savignyi, pp. 66–69, Figures 27–29, Map 12). (in English, with an abstract in German).
Sindaco, Roberto; Jeremčenko, Valery K. (2008). The Reptiles of the Western Palearctic: 1. Annotated Checklist and Distributional Atlas of the Turtles, Crocodiles, Amphisbaenians and Lizards of Europe, North Africa, Middle East and Central Asia. (Monographs of the Societas Herpetologica Italic). Latina, Italy: Edizioni Belvedere. 580 pp. .

Acanthodactylus
Endemic fauna of Algeria
Reptiles described in 1809
Taxa named by Jean Victoire Audouin
Taxonomy articles created by Polbot